Cornufer admiraltiensis is a species of frog in the family Ceratobatrachidae. It is endemic to Papua New Guinea.  It has been found on the Manus and Negros Islands in the Admiralty Archipelago.

Original description

References

admiraltiensis
Endemic fauna of Papua New Guinea
Amphibians of Papua New Guinea
Taxa named by Stephen J. Richards
Amphibians described in 2007